Impeachment in the Philippines is an expressed power of the Congress of the Philippines to formally charge a serving government official with an impeachable offense. After being impeached by the House of Representatives, the official is then tried in the Senate. If convicted, the official is either removed from office or censured.

Impeachment followed by conviction is often the only way to forcibly remove a sitting official. While "impeachment" is often used to refer to the entire process of removing an official from office, it only formally refers to the indictment stage in the House of Representatives, not the trial stage in the Senate. Under the current Constitution, an official can be impeached if one third of the House of Representatives votes in favor. Since it takes only a simple majority to set the agenda or to adjourn the House, it can be difficult for a minority of one third to bring a vote and impeach an official.

History

Third Republic
President Elpidio Quirino was accused in 1949 of using government fund to renovate Malacañang Palace, using government funds to purchase furniture for the Presidential Palace and linking him to alleged diamond smuggling. A Congressional committee rejected this complaint for lack of factual and legal basis.

In 1964, President Diosdado Macapagal was accused of illegally importing rice to build public support in an election, illegally dismissing officials, using the military to intimidate the political opposition, and ordering the deportation of an American businessman who was in the custody of Congress in violation of the separation of governmental powers. A Congressional committee dismissed all the charges.

Fourth and Fifth Republic
President Ferdinand Marcos was accused by 56 lawmakers on 1985 of graft, economic plunder, unexplained wealth, granting monopolies to cronies, and other crimes. the following day the National Assembly committee dismissed the complaints after roughly five hours of discussions for continuing unsupported conclusions.

President Corazon Aquino was accused by lawmakers in 1988 of graft and violating the Constitution. The charges were rejected the following month due to lack of evidence.

President Joseph Estrada was accused of bribery, graft and corruption, betrayal of public trust, and culpable violation of the Constitution during the impeachment of 2000, to determine the accusations, the House of Representatives choose 11 members to act as prosecutors with the Senate as the impeachment court and the senators as judges. On November 13, 2000, then-House Speaker Manny Villar sent the articles of impeachment to the Senate for the impeachment trial.
 
The impeachment trial started on December 7, 2000, which was presided by then-Chief Justice Hilario Davide, Jr. but was aborted on January 16, 2001, after the House private prosecutors walked out from the impeachment proceedings, to protest against the perceived dictatorial tendency of the eleven senator-judges, who supported President Estrada. The walkout led to Second EDSA Revolution and the downfall of President Estrada.

President Gloria Macapagal Arroyo was accused in 2005, 2006, 2007 and 2008 impeachment complaints for different imputations, specially attempting lying, cheating and stealing during 2004 presidential election against opposition candidate Fernando Poe, Jr. However all impeachment cases were failed due to absence of one third vote from the members of Congress.

President Benigno Aquino III was charged in 2014, of 4 impeachment complaints, in relations to the Disbursement Acceleration Program (DAP) which was declared by the Supreme Court as Unconstitutional and the Enhanced Defense Cooperation Agreement (EDCA) between the Philippines and United States, but the House Justice Committee rejects the complaints due to lack of substance.

In 2017 and 2019, impeachment complaints have been filed against both President Rodrigo Duterte and Vice President Leni Robredo.

Other government officials
Ombudsman Aniano Desierto was criticized by some for not aggressively investigating and prosecuting cases of corruption. The impeachment failed.

COMELEC commissioner Luzviminda Tancangco was accused of graft and corruption, betrayal of public trust and culpable violation of the Constitution. She allegedly showed bias for the multi-billion-peso voters registration and information system (VRIS) project, deciding to undertake it despite the lack of funds.
 
Chief Justice Hilario Davide, Jr. was accused of culpable violation of the Constitution, betrayal of the public trust and other high crimes.
 
COMELEC Chairman Benjamin Abalos was accused of ZTE national broadband network (NBN) deal and Hello Garci controversy but resigned eventually.
 
Ombudsman Merceditas Gutierrez was impeached on March 22, 2011, on charges of the office's underperformance and failure to act on several cases during then-President Gloria Macapagal Arroyo's administration. The first impeachment complaint against Gutierrez was filed in 2009, but was dismissed later in that year in a House dominated by Arroyo's Lakas Kampi CMD party.

In December 2011, 188 of the 285 members of the House of Representatives voted to transmit the 56-page Articles of Impeachment against Supreme Court Chief Justice Renato Corona.

Commission on Elections Chairman Andres D. Bautista had filed a resignation on October 11, 2017, but with effectivity date on December 31, 2017. But due to not stating immediate effectivity of the resignation, on the same day, the House of Representatives still voted to impeach the poll chief with 137 votes (more than 1/3 votes) from the House, overturning a justice committee resolution that earlier dismissed the complaint against him. Bautista eventually made his resignation effective later in the month, before the Senate convened as an impeachment court.

Impeachment proceeding of Chief Justice Maria Lourdes Sereno was terminated after she was removed on May 11, 2018, via quo warranto by a special en banc session of the Supreme Court which also ruled that the Chief Justice post vacant; the petition alleged Sereno's appointment was void ab initio due to her failure in complying with the Judicial and Bar Council requirements

Public officials impeached
These are the people who were impeached by the House of Representatives in plenary.

To date, Corona's removal as Chief Justice and disqualification from public office is the only completion of the impeachment process. Estrada's impeachment trial ended prematurely, while Gutierrez and Bautista resigned before the Senate convened as an impeachment court.

Impeachable officials
Based on Article XI, Section 2 of the Constitution The following officials may be subjected to impeachment:
 President of the Philippines
 Vice President of the Philippines
 Justices of the Supreme Court of the Philippines 
 Members of the Constitutional Commissions:
 Commission on Elections
 Civil Service Commission
 Commission on Audit
 Ombudsman

Other officials can be removed from offices but not by impeachment: those under the executive department may be dismissed by the president; members of Congress can be expelled by two-thirds vote of the chamber the member is a part of; local elected officials can be removed from office through recall.

In the 1935 and 1973 constitutions, the President, the Vice President, the Justices of the Supreme Court, and the Auditor General were the impeachable officials.

Impeachable offenses
The Constitution limits the offenses to the following: culpable violation of the Constitution, treason, bribery, graft and corruption, other high crimes, or betrayal of public trust. In the 1935 and 1973 constitution, betrayal of public trust was not an impeachable offense.

Culpable violation of the constitution
For purposes of impeachment, "culpable violation of the Constitution" is defined as "the deliberate and wrongful breach of the Constitution." Further, "Violation of the Constitution made unintentionally, in good faith, and mere mistakes in the proper construction of the Constitution, do not constitute an impeachable offense."

Treason
According to the Revised Penal Code, treason is defined as "Any Filipino citizen who levies war against the Philippines or adheres to his/her enemies, giving them aid or comfort within the Philippines or elsewhere."

Bribery
The Revised Penal Code defines bribery in two forms:
 Direct bribery is "committed by any public officer who shall agree to perform an act constituting a crime, in connection with the performance of this official duties, in consideration of any offer, promise, gift or present received by such officer, personally or through the mediation of another."
 Indirect bribery is "committed by a public officer when he accept gifts offered to him by reason of his office."

Graft and corruption
Any violation of the Republic Act No. 3019, or the Anti-Graft and Corrupt Practices Act is an impeachable offense, on which a public official found to have acquired, whether in his name or in the name of other persons, an amount of property and/or money manifestly out of proportion to his salary.

Betrayal of Public Trust
Betrayal of public interest, inexcusable negligence of duty, tyrannical abuse of power, breach of official duty by malfeasance or misfeasance, cronyism favoritism, etc. to the prejudice of public interest and which tend to bring the office into disrepute.

Other high crimes
Offenses which like treason and bribery, are so serious and enormous a nature as to strike at the very life or the orderly workings of the government

In Francisco Jr. vs. House of Representatives, the Supreme Court purposely refused to define the meaning of "other high crimes or betrayal of public trust," saying that it is "a non-justiciable political question which is beyond the scope of its judicial power." However, the Court refuses to name which agency can define it; the Court impliedly gives the power to the House of Representatives, which initiates all cases of impeachment.

Impeaching Procedures
The Impeachment proceedings shall proceed in accordance to Article XI, Section 3 of the Constitution of the Philippines, as follows:

 Any citizen with an endorsement of a member of the House of Representative may file charges.
 The House Committee on Justice will decide by majority vote if the complaint 
has substance.
sufficient in form.
sufficient in grounds.
probable cause in the complaint.
 The House Committee will refer it to House Plenary that will be voted upon with at least one-third votes
 If the vote passes, the complaint will become the "Articles of Impeachment" and the House will appoint prosecutors who may or may not be members of the House, they will be headed by the Chairman of House Committee on Justice
 If the vote fails in any part of the procedure, the official accused can't be filed for impeachment for one calendar year.
 The Senate will then try to convict the impeached official. Conviction requires a two-thirds vote.
 If convicted, there are two punishments the Senate can mete out:
 Censure or a reprimand, or
 Removal from office and prohibition to hold any governmental office

In the 1935 constitution, a two-thirds vote was needed to impeach an official by the House of Representatives, while a three-fourths vote in the Senate was required to convict.

Limits
The 1987 (current) constitution limits the number of impeachment complaints that can be filed against an official to one per year. There has been controversy over what counts as an impeachment complaint. While some argued that for a complaint to count against the limit it must be voted on, and others have proposed other interpretations, the House has decided that any complaint filed fulfills the quota regardless of how well-formed it is or who filed it. Therefore, supporters of a vulnerable official can file a weak, flawed, or unconstitutional complaint, thereby using up the quota and protecting that official from impeachment for that year.

There has also been debate about whether a year should be a calendar year, say 2006, or a full 12-month period. An example of how this limit works in practice are the attempts to impeach President Gloria Macapagal Arroyo. While the Philippine impeachment procedures parallel the United States' impeachment procedures, the two procedures differ in two significant ways: the percentage needed to impeach and the numerical limit on impeachment procedures.

Notes
If the President of the Philippines is on trial, such as in 2001, the Chief Justice of the Supreme Court of the Philippines shall preside but not vote.

References

External links
 Constitutional Basis and Annotations from lawphil.net
 Rules of Procedure in Impeachment Proceedings (pdf)
 Archives for Arroyo Impeachment
 Judging the Chief Justice: A Recapitulation by The CenSEI Report

 
Politics of the Philippines